Guillarei railway station is the main railway station of Guillarei in Galicia, Spain. It mainly serves regional and long-distance traffic across different areas in Galicia and northern Spain in general, as well as connecting local services to northern Portugal.

Services

References

Railway stations in Galicia (Spain)
Buildings and structures in the Province of Pontevedra